Johanna "Ans" Koning (27 March 1923 – 22 July 2006) was a Dutch javelin thrower. She competed at the 1948 Summer Olympics and finished in 6th place. Two years earlier she won a bronze medal at the 1946 European Athletics Championships.

References

1923 births
2006 deaths
Sportspeople from The Hague
Dutch female javelin throwers
Olympic athletes of the Netherlands
Athletes (track and field) at the 1948 Summer Olympics
European Athletics Championships medalists